Ptinus palliatus is a species of spider beetle in the family Ptinidae.

References

Further reading

 
 
 
 
 

Ptinus
Beetles described in 1847